The Type 351 is the Chinese copy of the Russian Reya radar system which came into service in 1960. It is an improved version of earlier Pot Drum (1958) with higher resolutions. Type 351 operates in two pulse bands, the wide one for search, and the narrow one for track, and both in X-band.

It was found primarily in older FACs such as the Hainan.

Specifications
(Based on Reya)
 I–band
 Beam: 3°
 Peak Power: 100 kW
 Pulse width: 0.25–1 µs
 PRF: 1600–1650, 3200–3300 pps
 Other reported names:
 POTHEAD
 Reya

References

Sea radars